Juan Durán may refer to:

Juan Durán de Miranda, Spanish governor of New Mexico
Juan Durán (footballer) (born 2001), Spanish footballer